
Gravenmolen is a defunct restaurant in Amsterdam, Netherlands. It was a fine dining restaurant that was awarded one Michelin star in 1972 and retained that rating until 1976.

Head chef in the period of the Michelin star was Cees Gravendeel. Other head chefs mentioned: mr. Esvelt (1978) and A. Koene (undated).

See also
List of Michelin starred restaurants in the Netherlands

References

External links
 

Restaurants in Amsterdam
Michelin Guide starred restaurants in the Netherlands
Defunct restaurants in the Netherlands